The men's 110 metres hurdles event at the 2005 Summer Universiade was held on 15–16 August in Izmir, Turkey.

Medalists

Results

Heats
Wind:Heat 1: -1.4 m/s,  Heat 2: -0.6 m/s,  Heat 3: +0.8 m/s,  Heat 4: -1.3 m/s

Semifinals
Wind:Heat 1: 0.0 m/s,  Heat 2: +2.0 m/s

Final
Wind: -0.4 m/s

References
Finals results
Full results
Heats results

Athletics at the 2005 Summer Universiade
2005